North Steads Wind Farm is an onshore electricity generating site west of Widdrington in Northumberland, England. The site was developed on old coal opencast workings and has nine turbines delivering over 18 megawatts of power per year.

History
Consent for the wind farm was granted in 2012, though construction of the site did not start until August 2015, one month after Infinis (later renamed as Ventient Energy) acquired the site from Peel Energy. The original planning permission sought was for 13 units, but this was reduced to nine operational units at North Steads, as four already existed at another site nearby called Sisters Wind Farm. The site was commissioned in June 2016, with the name North Steads Wind Farm, after the local community campaigned for the name to be changed from Blue Sky Forest, which Peel Energy developed the site as. North Steads was developed on the former coal opencasting site of Maiden Hall and Steadsburn, half of which had ceased coaling operations in 2006, though the  Steadsburn site was still blasting rock in 2009.

The output of the site is rated as 18.45 megawatts, which is enough to power over 11,700 homes annually.

Six of the turbines are surrounded by woodland (North Steads Plantation), and the three southernmost, are on arable land.

See also
List of onshore wind farms in the United Kingdom

Notes

References

External links
Ventient Energy

Wind farms
Wind farm articles using Infobox power station
Wind farms in England